SDU The Journal of Faculty of Economics and Administrative Sciences (full name: Süleyman Demirel University the Journal of the Faculty of Economics and Administrative Sciences) is a triannual peer-reviewed academic journal that publishes research articles about economics and administrative sciences. The journal was established in June 1996 and is published by SDU Press. It is indexed by the EBSCO databases.

References

External links
  (in English)
  (in Turkish)

Multilingual journals
Triannual journals
Publications established in 1996
Süleyman Demirel University